Heavyweight champions Rocky Marciano and Jersey Joe Walcott fought two historic boxing matches in 1952 and 1953. The first fight saw Marciano, the undefeated challenger, take on the world heavyweight champion Jersey Joe in a hard fought championship fight. The fight culminated in a 13th round knockout scored by  Marciano, in a major comeback victory after Walcott stacked up a wide lead throughout the majority of the bout. The fight and the final round were ranked as 1952’s fight and round of the year respectively by The Ring, and is now considered one of the greatest heavyweight championship bouts of all time.

The two fighters had a rematch the following year, and saw Marciano’s first successful defense of his title, winning a quick victory over the former champion.

Background 
During Jersey Joe Walcott’s over two decade long boxing career, he would fight for the heavyweight title several times. In four close fights, he lost championship challenges to Joe Louis and Ezzard Charles (twice to each), before finally winning the undisputed heavyweight title in 1951 after a knockout victory over Charles in a third match. At the age of 37, Walcott was the oldest man to win the heavyweight championship (a record he held for over 30 years until he was surpassed by George Foreman in 1994). He defended his title in a 15 round unanimous decision in a fourth fight with Charles, before facing Marciano.

Rocky Marciano had built up an impressive record of 42 straight victories, winning all but 5 in knockout or stoppage. He rose into prominence in the early 1950’s, scoring notable victories over several top contenders, including Joe Louis, before facing off with Walcott. Marciano was a slight favorite to beat the older champion, though the more experienced Walcott entered the fight confident of victory.

First fight 
The two fighters met on September 23rd, 1952 in Philadelphia. The fight proved to be a very hard fought match for both men.  Walcott spent most of the fight using his superior boxing skills and reach to keep the challenger on the outside, where he could more easily pick his shots and effectively counter Rocky’s punches. Marciano attempted to close the distance, hoping to wear the champion down with constant punching. Walcott scored knock down in the opening round (the first of only two times Rocky was knocked off his feet), and from there put up a comfortable lead over the challenger, although Marciano kept constant pressure on the champion, scoring heavy blows through the fight. 

Going into the 13th round, Walcott was ahead on all scorecards (8-4 and 7-5 by the judges and 7-4 by referee Charley Daggert), and seemed poised to win the fight by a decision. This all changed less than a minute into the round, when Marciano landed a devastating right hook (just before Walcott could land one of his own) which knocked the champion out cold. Marciano won via 13th round knockout, and was now the new heavyweight champion of the world.

Rematch 
Marciano’s first title defense was a rematch with Walcott eight months later, meeting in Chicago. Although Marciano was heavily favored to defeat Walcott (who was now 39 years old), fans still expected another tough fight. The fight would end up being almost the opposite.

The fight saw both men attempt to repeat strategies that worked in the previous bout, with Walcott trying to keep the champion at range and Marciano aggressively trying to keep constant pressure on the challenger. Only two minutes into the first round, Marciano countered one of Walcott’s jabs with a left hook followed by a right uppercut that sent the former champion to the ground. Although stunned, Walcott did attempt to beat the count, but ultimately rose a split second too late, and was counted out. The first round knockout would be Marciano’s quickest title defense.

Aftermath and legacy 
After the fight, Walcott ultimately decided to retire, but stayed active in boxing, going on to become a referee (presiding over several championship bouts including the controversial rematch between Muhammad Ali and Sonny Liston in 1965). In the 70’s and 80’s he also served as the first African American sheriff of Camden County, New Jersey, and as chairman of the New Jersey State Athletic Commission.

Marciano would go on to hold the heavyweight title until his retirement in 1956, defending his title five more times and going on to retire undefeated and untied. He never attempted a comeback (although he did spare with Muhammad Ali in a famous computer fight), and remained a popular figure in boxing after retirement, particularly on television and radio before his untimely death in a 1969 plane crash.

Marciano and Walcott’s first fight is regarded as one of the greatest in boxing history, being ranked the 1952 fight of the year by The Ring. The fight was also ranked the 16th greatest fight of all time by both The Ring and BoxRec, while Bleacher Report ranked it the 10th greatest heavyweight match of all time.

References

External links 

 Jersey Joe Walcott vs. Rocky Marciano (1st meeting)

 Rocky Marciano vs. Jersey Joe Walcott (2nd meeting)

Boxing matches
1952 in boxing
Rocky Marciano
1953 in boxing
1952 in American sports
1953 in American sports